"Sonífera Ilha" is the debut single by Brazilian rock band Titãs, released in 1984. The song, as well as its b-side "Toda Cor", was co-composed by Ciro Pessoa, one of the lead singers and founding members of the group, who would leave the band before the release of their first, self-titled album, in which the single and the b-side were included. "Sonífera Ilha" is among a few of Ciro's contributions to Titãs.

Although coming from an album that sold poorly, the song was a great hit in Brazil. According to website "A Vitrine do Rádio" and the Rolling Stone Brasil magazine, it was the song with most airplay in the country in 1984.

Then vocalist Paulo Miklos (main singer of the song) described the track in 2012 as follows: "A ska with a kinda dodecaphonic thing, a kinda weird phrase, telling a cock-and-bull story. I never knew what the song is about."

In a 2020 video, then former vocalist and bassist Nando Reis commented that "Sonífera Ilha" was the only song that the audience knew at the time of its release and their other songs sounded too different from the track, and that because of it they would sometimes perform the song three times in a single show.

The song has been covered by artists such as Adriana Calcanhotto, Pato Fu and Blitz, among others (see details below).

Track listing

Titãs Trio Acústico version 

In 2020, the band, then reduced to a trio (Branco Mello on vocals, acoustic guitar and bass; Sérgio Britto on vocal, keyboards and bass; and Tony Bellotto on vocals, acoustic and electric guitar, re-recorded the track as part of their Titãs Trio Acústico project.<ref name="oglobosi">{{cite web |last=Essinger |first=Silvio |title=Tony Bellotto: 'Estão vendo um novo sentido para a letra de 'Sonífera ilha |url=https://oglobo.globo.com/cultura/tony-bellotto-estao-vendo-um-novo-sentido-para-letra-de-sonifera-ilha-1-24326619 |work=O Globo |publisher=Grupo Globo |access-date=25 March 2020 |date=25 March 2020}}</ref>

The new version, sung by Mello, received a video with guest appearances by band Os Paralamas do Sucesso; musicians Rita Lee, Roberto de Carvalho, Andreas Kisser, Lulu Santos, Cyz Mendes (singer who guest performed on the band's opera rock, Doze Flores Amarelas), Érika Martins, Elza Soares and marcelo fEdi Rock; actors Fábio Assunção and Fernanda Montenegro; sports commentator and former football player Casagrande; and Marcelo Fromer's (the band's guitarist until his death in 2001 and co-author of the track) daughter, Alice.

The video was directed by Otávio Juliano, who said: "'Sonífera Ilha' is a song that left a deep mark in generations. When I listened to the new acoustic version, I felt it was more than a song, it was a state of mind. It came from there the idea of inviting artists and friends that were part of Titãs' history, bringing their personalities and embarking on this state of mind with the band".

The guest appearances were recorded by the artists themselves in their houses; such aesthetics would end up coinciding with the quarantine to which several people subjected themselves due to the coronavirus pandemic in 2020. By then, Bellotto said in an interview to O Globo newspaper:

 Cover versions 
 Adriana Calcanhotto, on her 1990 debut album Enguiço Paulinho Moska on his 1997 live album Através do Espelho Moraes Moreira (from Novos Baianos) on his solo album 50 Carnavais Terra Samba (2004)
 Karla Sabah on her 2004 solo album Drum 'n Bossa Blitz on their 2006 live album Blitz - Com Vida Pot-pourri recorded the song and it was featured as the opening theme for the Rede Globo telenovela Três Irmãs (Three Sisters)
 Pato Fu on their 2010 album Música de Brinquedo''

References

1984 debut singles
1984 songs
Titãs songs
Warner Music Group singles
Songs written by Marcelo Fromer
Songs written by Tony Bellotto
Songs about islands